Arthur Eugene Sutherland Jr. (Feb 9, 1902 – Mar 10, 1973) was an American lawyer, law professor, and author.

Biography

Arthur E. Sutherland Jr. was the youngest son of Arthur E. Sutherland a Justice of the New York State Supreme Court. He was born and raised in Rochester New York. He attended college at Wesleyan University class of 1922, and was a member of the noted Harvard Law School Class of 1925. He clerked for US Supreme Court Justice Oliver Wendell Holmes Jr. 1927–1928.

After law school Sutherland returned to practice law for 14 years in Rochester, N.Y. with his father, Arthur E. Sutherland and uncle William Sutherland.

Sutherland married Margaret Susan Adams and had four children: David, Peter,  Eleanor and Prudy. Mrs. Sutherland passed away New Year's Eve 1957/1958, one of the 70,000 Americans who died of the Asian flu during the 1957 pandemic. His second wife was Mary Elizabeth Genung Kirk.

Arthur E. Sutherland died of cancer in 1973 in Cambridge, Massachusetts.

Career

Military service

In 1919, as a young man of 16, Sutherland was invited by James L. Barton to participate in an investigation of Post WWI conditions in Anatolia  with Captain Emory H. Niles. Sutherland and Niles  surveyed areas of the recently toppled Ottoman Empire. The result was the Niles and Sutherland Report for the US Congress.

During the Second World War, Sutherland served as Aide-de-Camps to General Mark W. Clark with distinction in the U.S. Army. He left the Army in 1945 as a Colonel, with a number of high honors, including the Bronze Star and the Order of the British Empire.

Awards and decorations
See Historical Bio

Law professor

Cornell University invited Arthur E. Sutherland Jr. to teach law after WWII in 1945.

Soon after, in 1950 Harvard Law School invited him to teach. Arthur E. Sutherland Jr. was the Bussey Professor of Law Emeritus, author of a number of books on the law, and a frequently cited legal scholar on topics of both constitutional and commercial law. He was a member of the Harvard Faculty of Law for twenty years between 1950-1970. Sutherland helped draft the Uniform Commercial Code, a body of laws establishing common trade practices among the United States. He was chair of a special committee working to revise Massachusetts "blue laws" in 1962. The simpler and more coherent set of laws was later adopted by the Massachusetts Legislature. Sutherland was on the opposing legal team in the Gallagher v. Crown Kosher Super Market "Blue Laws" case brought before the US Supreme Court.

Sutherland was an associate of Harvard's Adams House and was acting Master of Lowell House for a year from 1965 to 1966.

Loeb University Professor, Paul A. Freund said of Sutherland that he "was an unusual combination of the scholarly and the homespun," with great "liveliness of mind and spirit." "His teaching was enlivened by anecdotes from the real world of law practice. He was one of the most popular Law School Faculty members within the larger University," Freund continued.

Selected works

 The Law at Harvard: A History of Ideas and Men, 1817-1967
 The Path of Law from 1967: Proceedings and Papers at the Harvard Law School Convocation Held on the One-Hundred Fiftieth Anniversary of Its Founding, edited by Arthur E. Sutherland Jr.
 Government Under Law A Conference Held at Harvard Law School on the Occasion of the Bicentennial of John Marshall Chief Justice of the United States, 1801–1835, edited by Arthur E. Sutherland Jr.
 Constitutionalism in America: Origins & Evolution of Its Fundamental Ideas
 Apology for Uncomfortable Change: 1865/1965- Oliver Wendell Holmes Lectures At the University of North Carolina October 1963
 Constitutional Law: Cases and Other Problems, Henry Monagham, Paul A. Freund, Arthur E Sutherland, Mark DeWolf Howe, Ernest J. Brown

References

External links
 Arthur E Sutherland papers, 1923-1972, at Harvard University.

Harvard University faculty
Harvard Law School faculty
People from Monroe County, New York
1902 births
1973 deaths
Harvard Law School alumni
Wesleyan University alumni
20th-century American writers
Cornell University faculty